This is a list of the German Media Control Top100 Singles Chart number ones of 2003.

Number-one hits by week

See also
List of number-one hits (Germany)

Notes

References

External links
 charts.de
 germancharts.com

Number-one hits
Germany
2003
2003